In the Holy Roman Empire, the German term  referred to the territory ruled by a bishop as a prince (i.e. prince-bishop), as opposed to his diocese, generally much larger and over which he exercised only spiritual authority.

The  was made of land mostly acquired in the Middle Ages through donations by the king/emperor, bequests by local lords or through purchase. It was often made of non-contiguous parts, some of which could be located outside the bishop's diocese. Exercising a double function, an ecclesiastical and a secular one, the prince-bishops were thus subject to two different legal bases and two jurisdictions. The relationship between the two functions was governed in part by the Concordat of Worms of 1122.

The prince-bishop, elected by the canons of the cathedral chapter and often belonging to the high nobility, enjoyed imperial immediacy; he wielded the same authority over his principality as any secular prince, such as a duke or a margrave, over his. He had seat and vote at the Imperial Diet.

They had all been secularized and their territory absorbed by secular states by the time the Holy Roman Empire was dissolved in 1806.

Etymology and related and derived terms

Das Stift [plural: die Stifte or, in some regions, die Stifter]/het sticht [in Dutch] (literally, the "donation"), denotes in its original meaning the donated or else acquired fund of estates whose revenues are taken to maintain a college and the pertaining church (Stiftskirche, i.e. collegiate church) and its collegiate canons (Stiftsherr[en]) or canonesses (Stiftsfrau[en]). If the Stift as a fund served to maintain the specific college of a cathedral (a so-called cathedral chapter) then the Stift was often called das Domstift (i.e. cathedral donation [fund]).

Hochstift is a compound with hoch ("high") used for a prince-bishopric, meaning literally a "high [ranking ecclesiastical] donation [fund of estates]". Whereas Erzstift, a compound with Erz… ("arch[i]…"), was the corresponding expression for a prince-archbishopric. For the three prince-electorates of Cologne (Kurköln), Mainz (Kurmainz) and Trier (Kurtrier), which were simultaneously archbishoprics the corresponding term is Kurerzstift (electorate-archbishopric). The adjective pertaining to Stift as a territory is stiftisch (of, pertaining to a prince-bishopric; prince-episcopal). As a compound, the term Stift today usually takes the copulative "s" when used as a preceding compound, such as in Stiftsadel (vassal nobility of a prince-bishopric), Stiftsamtmann (=official of a Stift), Stiftsmann (plural: Stiftsleute; =vassal tenant of an estate of a Stift), Stiftssasse (=subject/inhabitant of a prince-bishopric), Stiftsstände (=estates of a prince-bishopric as a realm), or Stiftstag (diet of the estates of a prince-bishopric).

Specific prince-bishoprics were often called Hochstift/Erzstift X, as in Hochstift Ermland or in Erzstift Bremen, with stiftbremisch meaning of/pertaining to the Prince-Archbishopric of Bremen, as opposed to stadtbremisch (of/pertaining to the city of Bremen). By contrast, the spiritual entities, the dioceses, are called Bistum ("diocese") or Erzbistum ("archdiocese") in German. The difference between a Hochstift/Erzstift and a Bistum/Erzbistum is not always clear to authors so that non-scholarly texts often translate Hochstift or Erzstift incorrectly simply as diocese/bishopric or archdiocese/archbishopric, respectively.

Notes

Prince-bishoprics of the Holy Roman Empire
Catholic Church and finance